Oise is a department in the north of France.

Oise may also refer to:

 Oise (river), a river flowing through Belgium and France
 Canal latéral à l'Oise, a canal parallel to the Oise (river)
 Val-d'Oise, a department of France located in the Île-de-France region
 , a ship, frigate of the French Navy of the Fifth Republic
 Oise stone, a type of limestone used for construction
 Bourdon de l'Oise (1758-1798), a French politician

OISE, as a four-letter acronym, may refer to:

 Ontario Institute for Studies in Education, an educational institute in Canada

See also

 Ronde de l'Oise, a cycling race
 Seine–Oise–Marne culture, a prehistoric Chalcolithic culture found in France
 Grand Paris Seine et Oise, France; a conurbation
 Seine-et-Oise, a former department of France
 Sambre–Oise Canal, France
 Oise-Somme Canal, France